Innocence Undone is an American romance novel by Kat Martin. It was published in 1997 by St. Martin's Press, and is part of Martin's Kingsland series.

Plot
The novel is set in Georgian-era England, and centers around Jessie Fox, the daughter of a prostitute, being taken in by the old Marquess of Belmore to be raised as a lady. The Marquess intends to have the Jessie marry his son Matthew, a Navy captain, so that they can both inherit the Belmore title after he passes. Matthew, knowing Jessie's reputation as a street child, believes that Jessie is manipulating his father into treating her like a lady, while Jessie fears that her true backstory will be discovered by the public and tarnish the Belmore name.

Characters

Main
 Jessica "Jessie" Fox - the 19-year-old daughter of a prostitute who is brought up by the Marquess of Belmore
 Captain Matthew Seaton, Earl of Strickland - a Captain in the Royal Navy, Commander of His Majesty's gunship the Norwich, younger son of the Marquess of Belmore, and Jessie's love interest
 Reginald Seaton, Marquess of Belmore - the father of Matthew and Richard Seaton, and the surrogate father of Jessie Fox

References

External links
 Innocence Undone on Kat Martin's website
 Innocence Undone, scanned and illustrated books at Internet Archive.
 Innocence Undone at LibraryThing
 Innocence Undone at Kobo Inc.
 Innocence Undone at Macmillan.com
 Innocence Undone at Goodreads

1997 American novels
American romance novels
Novels about nobility
Novels set in England